Anil Das is a Malayalam film director and screenwriter from Kerala, India. Born in Kottayam  and settled in Kollam. He is known as Director of Off-Beat movies. Malayalam Film Actor Kollam Ajith is his brother.

His Bharathan Effect (2007) the first science fiction movie in Malayalam, scripted by Madhu Muttam of Manichithrathazhu fame, received positive reviews from the film press for its venture into the unexplored.

His debut movie was Sargavasantham {സര്‍ഗ്ഗവസന്തം}(1995), written by the famous novelist Kakkanadan. Another Off-Beat movie of Anil Das was psychological-thriller Alice - A True Story (2014), a Psycho Analysis subject in which he has also written the story and screenplay. The movie with the star cast of Priyamani, Rahul Madhav, and Pratap Pothen tells the story of a woman with the split personality condition called fugue.

His next project, which he is penning along with G R Indugopan, is based on the subject euthanasia.

Filmography
 Sargavasantham (1995)
 Bharathan Effect (2007)
 Alice : A True Story (2014)

References

External links
 
 

Malayalam film directors
Male actors from Kottayam
Living people
Film directors from Kerala
Year of birth missing (living people)
Male actors in Malayalam cinema
Malayalam-language lyricists